School of Rock is the soundtrack album of the film of the same title starring Jack Black. It was released on September 30, 2003. The film's director Richard Linklater scouted the country for talented 11-year-old musicians to play the rock music that features on the soundtrack and in the film. This is Miranda Cosgrove's music debut as she is featured with the School of Rock cast. Sammy James Jr. of the band The Mooney Suzuki penned the title track with screenwriter Mike White, and the band backs up Black and the child musicians on the soundtrack recording of the song.

Chart performance
School of Rock: Original Soundtrack debuted and peaked at number ninety-five on the Billboard 200 chart in the United States. It performed better on Billboard's Top Soundtracks chart, where it reached the sixth position. In Austria, School of Rock debuted at number seventy and peaked at fifty-seven position.

Track listing

Other songs that featured in the film but weren't included on the soundtrack album include "Black Shuck" by The Darkness, "The Wait" by Metallica and "Mouthful of Love" by Young Heart Attack.

Awards 
The soundtrack was nominated for the 2004 Grammy Awards for Best Compilation Soundtrack Album for a Motion Picture, Television or Other Visual Media.

Charts

References 

2003 soundtrack albums
Rock soundtracks
Comedy film soundtracks